is a special type of phlegm generated by shamans and sorcerers of the Peruvian Amazon Basin which is believed to contain the essence of their power in the form of , , darts, arrows, or splinters of bone that are believed to be contained in the phlegm. It is believed that these may be fired from the mouth, and that being pierced by virotes causes various conditions. These may be removed by a shaman, who sucks them out of the victim's body.

Etymology
 is the Quechua word that means knowledge. It is derived from the verb  (know), specifically referring to ritual knowledge.

Mariri
 is the traditional name for a nature spirit that is believed to live in the phlegm. It is believed that the spirit is fed with tobacco smoke. Shamans believe that they can regurgitate the spirit at will and pass it on to a disciple. It is also believed that  can be given to someone from nature spirits, such as the  plant spirit.

Shamans use  as a defense and protection in acts of magic, it is also considered a powerful healer.

See also
 Icaro
 Shamanism
 Witch doctor

References

Entheogens
Peruvian culture
Shamanism of the Americas
Supernatural healing